This article covers the best practices and needs for reform in entrepreneurship policies in Saudi Arabia.

Entrepreneurship enjoys high level of support in Saudi Arabia, according to Jonathan Ortmans.  The Kingdom has been leading in the Arab region in terms of regulatory reforms related to entrepreneurship. According to the latest report of Doing Business (DB), the country ranked 13th globally and maintained its position in the first place in the region on the ease of doing business.  Saudi Arabia's consistent improvement in DB's six indicators propelled it to its latest ranking from 35th since 2004, using French law as a model in revising its policies.  In the latest World Economic Forum (WEF) Global Competitive Index (GCI 2010-2011), it moved up by seven places from 28th to 21st place which resulted in a strong and solid institutional framework, efficient markets, and sophisticated businesses places.  Real activity (real GDP) in Saudi Arabia was expected to grow at 3.4 percent in 2010 and 4.5 percent in 2011. Enactment of a new foreign investment law, establishment of the Saudi Arabian General Investment Authority (SAGIA) as well as privatizations of public companies in recent years have encouraged investments in the country.

However, businesses still face difficulties, enforcement of contracts and labor issues within the regulatory system in the country. Based on a Global Entrepreneurship Monitor (GEM) survey conducted from May to October 2009, among the factor-driven economies in the region, Saudi Arabia had the lowest total entrepreneurial activity (TEA) rate, only 4.7% of the adult population (18–64 years old) were actively involved in the start-up of a new business or owned a young business of less than three and half years old.  A study by Michael Porter in 2008 noted that Saudi Arabia could build a competitive economy and diversify beyond natural resources if it was willing to take a strategic approach, make multiple improvements in its business environment, truly open up competition and entrepreneurship in the private sector, and embark on a sustained effort to equip Saudi citizens with new skills, attitudes and mindsets.

Startup, ease of entry

For-profit companies
Best practices

In 2006, Saudi Arabia made it easier to start a business by simplifying processes at its Ministry of Commerce and cut registration time from 64 days to 39.  The Saudi Arabian General Investment Agency (SAGIA) finalized agreements with 17 government agencies to remove impediments and introduce incentives for businesses. SAGIA also launched its “10/10” project targeting the top ten by 2010. The reform continued in 2007, the time for start-up dropped from 39 days to 15 days by eliminating layers of bureaucracy.  Procedures at its Ministry of Commerce were sped up, publication requirements were merged and social security registration with the Chamber of commerce was automated. The reforms cut 6 procedures for forming a new company from 13 to 7 and the cost from 59% of income per capita to 32%. The commercial registration fees with its Ministry of Commerce were reduced by 80%, reducing the time to start a business by two days. It eliminated the requirement to publish the summary Articles of Association in the local newspaper. Instead, they need to be published only in the official gazette, at a cost of just 1,500–3,000 riyals. Saudi Arabia continued to simplify regulation formalities, in 2009 one-stop system was created at the Ministry of Commerce for business registration and  permits. It combined all registration procedures for local limited liability companies.
In June 2007, Saudi Arabia made the most dramatic reform in the ease of doing business by scrapping the high minimum paid in capital that used to be $124,464 and the fifth largest minimum capital requirement in the world, equivalent to 1057% income per capita.  Since its reform, the total number of annual business registered increased by 81%.
Saudi Arabia expedited the process of dealing with construction permits by adopting the one-day permit procedure by allowing builders to obtain temporary building permit to begin the construction after one day and a final building permit after just one week. Now entrepreneurs can complete registration in 1 procedure and 1 day at the new one-stop shop in Riyadh. The one-stop shop includes representatives from several government departments, the chamber of commerce, a private bank and the notary public. Again in 2010, Saudi Arabia made dealing with construction permits easier by introducing a new, streamlined process, reducing the procedures by five and time by five days, ranked the country to 14th place from 30th.
Until 2005, a Saudi entrepreneur pays nothing for registering a property, it only required to be notarized and not linked to a cadastre, which could lead to less security.   It was not until late 2005 when the Real Property Registration Law came into effect, this was the country's first property registry.  Saudi Arabia computerized procedures in 2007, making it possible to register property in 2 procedures and 2 days.  Under this new law, upon verification of the documents by the notary public, in the presence of the legal representative from the seller and the buyer, will submit the documents electronically to the Records Department to get the new title deed showing the new owner of the property. This will be added electronically in the centralized records in Riyadh. The sale agreement shall be scanned and save while the original is kept in the notary public's record.
The country improved procedures at ports by abolishing the requirement for a consular certificate and allowing submission of information required for customs clearance electronically. This reduced trading time by 2 days. In Jeddah's port, more containers are cleared in one day.  In 2009, Saudi Arabia cut fees by 50%. In 2010, Saudi Arabia launched a new container terminal at the Jeddah Islamic Port reducing the time to import to 17 days.
In 2008, Ministry of Trade and Industry amended provisions of its company law that addresses approval and disclosure requirements for related party transactions. In the new law, the interested directors may no longer vote at a shareholders meeting to approve related-party transactions. It increased the legal remedies available in cases dealing with the liability of directors for misconduct. Directors found liable for damage to a company due to a related party transaction will have to repay all profits made from it.

Needed reforms

Electronic registration of records: online name verification and other online services are common in Organisation for Economic Co-operation and Development (OECD) countries, Eastern Europe, Latin America and others, around 40 economies offer electronic registration services. This improves data safety, transparency and sharing of information.

Foreign Ownership

Best practices
Restrictions on foreign ownership are present in Saudi Arabia where local citizens are required to hold majority ownership in banking and insurance

Needed reforms

Finances

Best practices;
Saudi Arabia ranked well worldwide in the ease of getting credit in Doing Business report 2011, its rank moved up from 69th to 46th place. In 2004 Saudi Arabia's public registry cut the minimum loan size for collecting data substantially from 5 million riyals to 500,000, almost doubling the number of borrowers recorded. The bureau was set up with the support from the Central Bank.  In 2007, Saudi Arabia launched its private credit bureau. The bureau issues reports on companies’ credit exposure and includes their financial statements and ownership details both positive and negative information. By 2008, utility company like mobile telephone companies and retailers started providing information to the bureau. The credit bureau allowed borrowers to inspect and dispute their information The latest reform in 2010 was a big improvement, an amendment to Saudi Arabia's commercial lien law enhanced access to credit by making secured lending more flexible and allowing out-of-court enforcement in case of default. Saudi is planning to implement an electronic collateral registry in the future

Needed reforms

Contracts/Commercial Law

Best Practices
Saudi Arabia ranked 140th out of 183 economies in enforcing contracts. The enforcement of contracts is not always swiftly implemented; the procedural phases of filing, trial, judgment, and enforcement typically take an average of 635 days with 43 procedures. Due to the underdeveloped contract enforcement because of bureaucratic delays caused by conflicts between commercial laws and Islamic rules, this put the country as one of the unattractive place for dispute resolution among emerging markets.

Needed reforms

Bankruptcy
Best Practices
The Ministry of Commerce introduced strict deadlines for bankruptcy procedures in 2008. Auctions of debtors’ assets are expected to take place quicker than before. As a result, the process to determine the fate of a company in financial jeopardy (i.e., sale as going concern, piecemeal sale of assets, or approval of a reorganization plan) can range from 12 to 18 months. Once a judgment has been made and the fate of the company is determined, recovery of payment is fairly expeditious—creditors can expect to recover some monies owed within 1 month of judgment.
In 2009, Saudi Arabia established additional committees for amicable settlement of insolvencies put time limits on the settlements to encourage creditors to participate. Saudi Arabia are also developing automated case management systems. It will allow electronic filing and automatic assignment of court dates as well as keep a log of all proceedings.

Needed reforms

Taxes

Best Practices
Saudi Arabia ranked 7th worldwide in the latest report in the ease of paying taxes. As the government relies mostly on oil revenue to fund spending, businesses in the region pay some of the lowest tax rates in the world.

Education

As much as the recent improvements are commendable, the country faces important challenges going forward. Education in Saudi Arabia does not meet the standards of countries at similar income levels. While some progress is visible in the assessment of the quality of education, improvements are taking place from a low level. As a result, the country continues to occupy low ranks in the health and primary education (74th) and higher education and training (51st).  The youth consists of more than 70% of the country's population and many of young Saudis are looking to entrepreneurship as a career path. According to the latest survey conducted by Gallup between July to October 2009, among the high-income group in the region, 78% of the Saudi youth believed that their local communities are good places for such entrepreneurs and 30% of young Saudis who are not already business owners say they are planning to start their own business in the next 12 months. Youth in Saudi Arabia are three times as likely to say they are planning to launch a business if they perceive the government makes paperwork and permits easy enough for aspiring entrepreneurs. If out of work for more than six months, 51% of youth indicate they would be willing to take a job beneath their skills or train in a new field or start their own business. Among youth who express entrepreneurship aspirations, 61% are employed. Saudi youth reported dissatisfaction with efforts to increase the number of quality jobs within the Kingdom. However, 93% of young Saudis say taking part in regular job training increases their chances of getting a job.

Best Practices
Saudi Arabia has implemented reform in higher education by establishing the King Abdullah University of Science and Technology (KAUST) in 2009, the world's newest state-of-the-art graduate level research and entrepreneurial university. KAUST's Industry Collaboration Program (KICP), Technology Transfer Office, and Research Park underscore the university's mission to convert research discoveries into practical applications, to incubate new businesses, and to maximize industrial collaboration within Saudi Arabia as well as regionally, and globally
In 2009, the Prince Mohammed bin Fahd Leaders Preparation Center was established to prepare young Saudi girls to lead the future. Operating under the umbrella of the Prince Sultan bin Abdul Aziz Fund, it opened to Saudi girls between the ages of six and 25. Two programs at the center target different age groups: the Promising Leaders Program is designed for girls ages six to 15, and the Young Leaders Program caters to girls ages 16 to 25.

Labor market
Based on the case study conducted by World Bank on 2007, the oil sector in Saudi Arabia made up more than half the gross domestic product (GDP) but employed only 2% of the workforce and even if the oil maintained its high price, it would not generate the new jobs to satisfy the growing number of young Saudis who will enter the labor market over the next years. The latest report from WEF ranked the country 60th in the efficiency of labor market out of 183 economies.  The need to transform the Saudi economy was clear—from one based on inherited wealth to one based on innovation creating an ecosystem for entrepreneurship.

Ranking for the Arab Countries

Notes:
n/a - not ranked
Ease of Doing Business - ranked among 189 Economies
GCI Index - ranked among 139 Economies
Economic Freedom Score - 0 to 100, where 100 represents the maximum freedom
Prosperity Index -The Prosperity Index assessed 110 countries, accounting for over 90 percent of the world's population, and is based on 89 different variables, each of which has a demonstrated effect on economic growth or on personal wellbeing. The Index consists of eight sub-indexes, i.e. Economy, Entrepreneurship & Opportunity (E&O), Governance, Education, Health, Safety & Security, Personal Freedom and Social Capital.
The ICT value falls on a scale of 0-10 and is calculated from three key indicators: number of telephone lines per thousand of the population, number of computers per thousand of the population, and number of internet users per thousand of the population. The top 10 per cent of states score in the range 9-10, the next highest 10 per cent of states score in the range 8-9 and so on.
Innovation System Index - The index value falls on a scale of 0-10 and is calculated from three key indicators: Total royalty payments and receipts in US$ per person, number of patent applications granted by the US Patent and Trademark Office per million people, and the number of scientific and technical journal articles published per million people. The top 10 percent of states score in the range 9-10, the next highest 10 per cent of states score in the range 8-9 and so on.
HDI - Calculated based on data from UNDESA (2009d), Barro and Lee (2010), UNESCO Institute for Statistics (2010a), World Bank (2010g) and IMF (2010a).
Education and Human Resources Score - The index value falls on a scale of 0-10 and is calculated from three key indicators: adult literacy rate, secondary enrolment, and tertiary enrolment. The top 10 per cent of states score in the range 9-10, the next highest 10 per cent of states score in the range 8-9 and so on.
Press Freedom Index- The lower the value of a state's press freedom index, the better the situation for press freedom, ranked among 178 countries.

Notes

Economy of Saudi Arabia
Entrepreneurship